Freilichtspiele Neuenstadt  is a theatre in Neuenstadt am Kocher, Baden-Württemberg, Germany.

Theatres in Baden-Württemberg